Acurenam (or Akurenam) is a town located on mainland Equatorial Guinea, in Centro Sur. Population 2,714 (2008 est.)

Climate

References

Populated places in Centro Sur